The Order of Jerusalem may refer to various knighthoods/damehoods:

Knights Hospitaller and its modern-day successors
Teutonic Order and its modern-day successors
Order of Saint Lazarus of Jerusalem and its modern-day successors
Equestrian Order of the Holy Sepulchre of Jerusalem, a Roman Catholic chivalric order  
Honourable Order of Jerusalem, a Methodist chivalric order
Sovereign Military Order of the Temple of Jerusalem, an ecumenical Christian self-styled order
Order of Jerusalem (distinction), a distinction of the State of Palestine